A take-back system or simply takeback is one of the primary channels of waste collection, especially for e-waste, besides municipal sites. Take-back is the idea that manufacturers and sellers "take back" the products that are at the end of their lives. Take-back is aimed to reduce a business' environmental impacts on the earth and also increase efficiency and lower costs for their business models. "Take-back regulations have targeted a wide array of products including packaging, batteries, automobiles, and electronics"  and economic value can be found from recycling or re-manufacturing such products. "The programs benefit municipalities by lowering their overall waste disposal costs and reducing the burden on landfill sites". Although for certain companies, the take-back system is mandatory under legislation, many do it voluntarily.

Take-back can be split up into:
 Store retailer take-back and
 Producer take-back.

It can be further split into two types:
 Recycling
 Re-manufacturing

Recycling 

One major option of the take-back system includes store retailers or producers taking back the products that have been distributed to their consumers in order to recycle the materials of these products. The take-back system encourages businesses to redesign their products into ones that are easily recyclable, reducing the burden that virgin materials have on the environment for the present and the future. This also gives companies an alternative supply of raw minerals.

Re-manufacturing 
The other major option of the take-back system includes the store retailers or producers taking back their products in order to create new ones. This process uses the older products in order to restore it into products that are of the same quality as the new ones. By this process, companies save up to 85% of energy that would have been used to manufacture brand new products.

Economic effect 
The take-back system has shown economic effects for many companies that have adapted it. An example is Xerox, a company that has saved over $200 million from their take-back program in a year alone. The system encourages companies to create products that are easy to dissemble and re-manufacture in order to cut costs and generate revenue through taking back older products. In this way, companies can use older products that would have otherwise been thrown away in order to renovate them, allowing for them to be sold again just as Sprint has, in order to save over a billion dollars. In Wisconsin, the development of a take-back system created many new jobs, started a few companies, and had brought revenue from e-waste processing.

Environmental impact 
The take-back system provides a more environmentally friendly system for those that inherit it. The system gives the responsibility of handling waste to the producer, meaning that they are to guarantee that their products are dealt with when they are at the end of their lives. By taking old products back, companies reduce their environmental footprint on the world as their products are influenced to become more easily recyclable. The system influences companies to redesign their products in ways that are more cost-effective when they recycle, reuse, or re-manufacture their products. Policies of the system can require companies into using a certain amount of recycled material in their products, which reduces the amount of recovered materials that end up in landfills or incineration.

Circular economy 
The take-back system can be a main component to the business model that is called the circular economy. The circular economy is a plan for a business or company that aims to use and reduce their waste in order to become sustainable on their own. The take-back system allows for this model to work as it allows companies to recycle old products in order to become more environmentally friendly, where materials are used from these old products in order to use as resources and encourage sustainability. Not only that, but for most companies, the take-back system shows to be a more cost-effective system as it effectively minimizes waste management costs.

Implementation of take-back systems

Collection 
Due to a high cost in recycling but low amount of customer incentive, companies and countries refrain from adapting a take-back system. To fix this, e-waste could be taken back by the producers for donations, for re-manufacturing, or for upgrades.

Waste regulation legislation and government help 
Without legislation, a prominent take-back system cannot be achieved because current e-waste regulation systems are "limited to private recycling of high-value waste with only limited consumer participation". Rules and regulations that would incentive and fix issues regarding to the dumping electronic waste into landfills and prevent the illegal exportation of electronic waste are important to achieve success in e-waste management. The government would need to support it by giving incentives and the correct infrastructure in order to create such a system.

Initiatives 
"Initiatives refer to programs or schemes required to promote effective collection, recycling and disposal of e-waste". Through these incentives, the government and producers of waste must promote e-waste management on their own by giving effort in collecting e-waste to recycle, renew, or reuse it.

Awareness and responsibility 
Consumers of the products must become aware to how managing their waste affects the environment and the lack of programs that help teach these aspects show to be big barriers to the effective management of waste. To manage the waste properly, consumers must begin to show responsibility in bringing in their e-waste while companies such as the producers of these products must be responsible for taking it back and dealing with it.

Germany's take-back system 
Germany had set in put a packaging ordinance on June 12, 1991. "It specifies mandatory quotas for recycling for glass, paper/paperboard/carton, tin plate, aluminum, plastic, and composites". The responsibility for handling waste was put onto the manufacturer and distributor. As a result of the ordinance, "in 1993, the beginning of the mandatory quotas, compared to 1992, there were 500,000 fewer tons of packaging" and "From 1993 to 1994, paper packaging recycling increased from 55% to 70.6%". The system showed to be a success, as it reduced waste and redesigned packaging to be more environmentally friendly simply from integrating a version of the take-back system.

Issues 
While the take-back system aims to create more eco-friendly businesses, there are reasons why it does not profoundly exist today. The main reason for this is the lack of incentives. Being that there are products such as cars and computers that are unappealing to transport, the consumer finds it troubling and unappealing to bring these products back. Also, since many consumers see refurbished products as inferior and do not trust them, it is unappealing for companies to re-manufacture their own products for reselling purposes and thus cannot profit from it. Without the appropriate subsidies, in some cases it becomes more beneficial for a company to use virgin materials as opposed to recycling methods as it is cheaper, swaying some away from the take-back system.

See also 
 Extended producer responsibility
 Electronics right to repair

References

Images 

Waste collection
Electronic waste
Recycling